Periphyllidae is a family of jellyfish containing four genera and six species. The most well-known member of the family, Periphylla periphylla, is usually considered a deep-sea species, but it forms large blooms in surface waters of Norwegian fjords.

Genera
Nauphantopsis
 Nauphantopsis diomedeae Fewkes, 1885
Pericolpa
Pericolpa campana (Haeckel, 1880)
Pericolpa quadrigata Haeckel, 1880
Periphylla
 Periphylla periphylla (helmet jellyfish) (Péron & Lesueur, 1810)
Periphyllopsis
Periphyllopsis braueri Vanhöffen, 1902
Periphyllopsis galatheae Kramp, 1959

References

 
Taxa named by Ernst Haeckel
Cnidarian families
Coronatae